Penelope Plummer (born 26 October 1949) is an Australian actress, model and beauty queen who was crowned Miss World 1968. The then 18-year-old librarian from Kempsey, New South Wales, became the first contestant from her country to win the title.  The pageant was held in London, United Kingdom.

After winning the Miss World Contest, Plummer appeared in The 1969 Bob Hope Christmas Show in Osan, Korea, along with Swedish-American actress Ann-Margret.

Penelope Plummer married Michael Clarke on 1 January 1970 in Gosford, New South Wales.

A rose was named "Penelope Plummer" in 1970.

References

Extra reading
 Penelope Plummer receives a Jensen Interceptor car termed "Miss World Car".

1949 births
Australian beauty pageant winners
Living people
Miss World winners
Miss World 1968 delegates
People from the Mid North Coast